Madhawa Nimesh (born 5 February 1996) is a Sri Lankan cricketer. He made his first-class debut for Panadura Sports Club in Tier B of the 2016–17 Premier League Tournament on 2 December 2016. He made his List A debut for Kalutara District in the 2016–17 Districts One Day Tournament on 22 March 2017.

References

External links
 

1996 births
Living people
Sri Lankan cricketers
Kalutara Town Club cricketers
Panadura Sports Club cricketers
Kalutara District cricketers
Place of birth missing (living people)